Labium is the Latin word for lip. In English, it may refer to:
 Labia, a part of the female external genitalia
 Labium (botany), a modified petal in certain monocot flowers, which attracts insects for pollination
 Labium (arthropod mouthpart), a mouthpart of arthropods (the lower "lip")
 Labium (wasp), a genus of wasps in the family Ichneumonidae
 Labium (wind instrument), a part of wind instruments such as the recorder, see fipple

Labia is the plural of labium.  It may refer to:
 Labia (earwig), a genus of earwigs in the family Labiidae
 Labia family, a noble family of Venice

See also
 Labial (disambiguation)
 Labrum (disambiguation)